Charles Edward "Chuck" Davis, Jr. (Azerbaijani; born April 18, 1984 in Çarlz Eduard "Çak" Deyvis, Jr) is an American-born naturalized Azerbaijani professional basketball player who last played for Galatasaray S.K. of the Turkish Basketball Super League. He is 204 cm (6 ft 8.5 in) tall and plays both forward positions.

Davis is also a member of the Azerbaijan national basketball team.

The Basketball Tournament (TBT) (2017–present) 

In the summer of 2017, Davis played in The Basketball Tournament on ESPN for team Trained To Go.  He competed for the $2 million prize, and for team Trained To Go, he shot 67 percent in field goals in one game.  Davis and team Trained To Go lost in the first round of the tournament to the Broad Street Brawlers 108–95.

References

External links
TBLStat.net Profile
Eurocup Profile

1984 births
Living people
Alabama Crimson Tide men's basketball players
Aliağa Petkim basketball players
American emigrants to Azerbaijan
American expatriate basketball people in Belgium
American expatriate basketball people in Turkey
American men's basketball players
Azerbaijani men's basketball players
Azerbaijani people of African-American descent
Bandırma B.İ.K. players
BC Oostende players
Basketball players from Alabama
Galatasaray S.K. (men's basketball) players
Naturalized citizens of Azerbaijan
Sportspeople from Selma, Alabama
Power forwards (basketball)
Small forwards
TED Ankara Kolejliler players